OGLE-2007-BLG-349(AB)b is a circumbinary extrasolar planet about 8,000 light-years away in the constellation of Sagittarius. It is the first circumbinary exoplanet to be discovered using the microlensing method of detecting exoplanets.

Characteristics

Mass and orbit 
OGLE-2007-BLG-349L(AB)b is a super-Neptune, an exoplanet that has a mass and radius larger than that of Neptune. It has a mass of around 80 . This is somewhat close to the mass of Saturn, 95 , so OGLE-2007-BLG-349L(AB)b can also be considered a gas giant. It orbits at a distance of around 2.9 AU in a circumbinary orbit, meaning it orbits around two stars.

Host star
The planet orbits in a circumbinary (M-type) binary star system named OGLE-2007-BLG-349L. They orbit around each other roughly every 9 days. The stars have masses of 0.41 and 0.30 , respectively. The age of the system, radii and temperatures of the stars are not known. In comparison, the Sun is 4.6 billion years old and has a surface temperature of 5778 K. The star's apparent magnitude, or how bright it appears from Earth's perspective, is 14.3. Therefore, it is too dim to be seen with the naked eye.

See also 
 Optical Gravitational Lensing Experiment (OGLE)
 47 Ursae Majoris b
 OGLE-2005-BLG-390Lb
 OGLE-2006-BLG-109Lb

Notes

References

External links 

 OGLE-2007-BLG-349 AB c at the NASA Exoplanet Archive

Sagittarius (constellation)
Exoplanets discovered in 2016
Giant planets
Exoplanets detected by microlensing